Racotis deportata is a species of moth of the family Geometridae first described by Claude Herbulot in 1970. It is found in northern Madagascar.

This species looks similar to Racotis apodosima, Prout.

References

Ennominae
Moths described in 1970
Moths of Madagascar
Moths of Africa